Maring Naga may refer to:
 Maring Naga people (Maring Nagas) - Maring people
 Maring Naga language - Maring language